Ágota Bujdosó (born 2 June 1943 in Budapest) is a former Hungarian international handball goalkeeper.

Career

Club
Bujdosó started her career in 1957 in Vasas and has spent her entire career by the Angyalföld-based team. She enjoyed her best spell in the seventies, having won the Hungarian Championship seven times in a row between 1972 and 1978 and capturing four Hungarian cup titles beside. In addition, she has reached the final of the European Champions Cup 1978, but lost out 19–14 against TSC Berlin.

For her services, the loyal shot-stopper was awarded the Golden Ring of Vasas SC in 1991.

International
Bujdosó made her debut in the Hungarian national team in 1965 and has won 168 caps until her retirement in 1977. From 1969 she was the captain of the team. She was present on several international competitions, first in 1971, when she has won bronze medal on the World Championship after beating Romania in the placement match. Two years later she played with Hungary for the bronze again, but this time the team have lost to the Soviet Union and finished fourth. In 1975, on her third and last World Championship she has collected another bronze medal.

She was also member of the team that played on the 1976 Olympic Games. In a tightly contested tournament, Hungary finished third, falling short to silver medallist Germany only on goal difference.

Achievements
Nemzeti Bajnokság I:
Winner: 1972, 1973, 1974, 1975, 1976, 1977, 1978
Bronze Medallist: 1967, 1969, 1971
Magyar Kupa:
Winner: 1969, 1971, 1974, 1976
European Champions Cup:
Finalist: 1978
World Championship
Bronze Medallist: 1971, 1975
Olympic Games:
Bronze Medallist: 1976

Individual awards
 Hungarian Handballer of the Year: 1973, 1975
 Golden Ring of Vasas SC: 1991

References

1943 births
Living people
Handball players from Budapest
Hungarian female handball players
Handball players at the 1976 Summer Olympics
Olympic handball players of Hungary
Olympic bronze medalists for Hungary
Olympic medalists in handball
Medalists at the 1976 Summer Olympics
20th-century Hungarian women
21st-century Hungarian women